The betyárs (Hungarian: betyár (singular) or betyárok (plural)), were the highwaymen of the 19th century Kingdom of Hungary. The "betyár" word is the Hungarian version of "Social Bandit". (The word itself is of Ottoman Turkish origin:"bekar" means 'bachelor' or 'unmarried man' in Turkish.)

Several betyárs have become legendary figures who in the public mind fought for social justice. The most famous Hungarian betyárs were Sándor Rózsa from the Great Hungarian Plain, Jóska Sobri, Jóska Savanyú  from Bakony and Márton Vidróczky from Mátra.

Lviv Batayr's culture  ("батяр" (batiar)- ukrainian ) in the west part of Ukraine (Lviv, Ivano-Frankivsk, Zakarpatia, Ternopil oblast) was spread during the 19th and 20th centuries.

Hungarian folktale tradition
Until the 1830s they were mainly regarded as criminals, but an increasing public appetite for betyár songs, ballads and stories gradually gave a romantic image to these armed and usually mounted robbers.
Rózsa is only the foremost of many Hungarian outlaw heroes, or betyárs, who appear in Hungarian history and folklore. There is a far-flung Hungarian folktale tradition featuring a large number of local Robin Hoods.

Famous betyárs

Juraj Jánošík (1688-1713)
Sándor Rózsa (1813-1877)
 Jóska Savanyú
Szűts György
Szűcs (from aba)
Jóska Sobri (1810-1837)
Márton Vidróczki

See also
Csikós
Gulyás (herdsman)
Hajduk (soldiers)

References

Outlaws
19th century in Hungary